This article shows all participating team squads at the 2005 Women's Pan-American Volleyball Cup, held from June 8 to June 19, 2005 in Santo Domingo, Dominican Republic.

Head Coach: Alejandro Arconada

Head Coach: Naoki Miyashita

Head Coach: Luis Felipe Calderon

Head Coach: Francisco Cruz Jiménez

Head Coach: Lang Ping

References
NORCECA
USA Volleyball

S
P